Louis St. Martin (May 17, 1820 – February 9, 1893) was an American politician from Louisiana.

He first was elected to the Louisiana state house of representatives in 1840. However, he then held a federal appointment for much of the mid-1840s. He was a member of the Louisiana House of Representatives 1846–1850.  
In 1850 he was elected a member of the U. S. House of Representatives representing the state of Louisiana in its First District, which at the time encompassed part of New Orleans and everything east of the city but south of Lake Pontchartrain.  At this point he only served one term in Congress. He was a Democrat.

In 1852 he did not run for reelection and then went into business ventures.  About this time he served as an election commissioner for the city of New Orleans.

He was elected to Congress in 1864, but Congress refused to accept the reconstruction of Louisiana as it stood then and refused to seat any members of Congress from the state.  St. Martin was again elected to the Forty-first Congress, but the house ruled the election invalid, and St. Martin was not returned by the latter election to that congress that allowed for Universal Male Suffrage in the state. In 1884, when the vote had again been essentially restricted to only white males in Louisiana, St. Martin was returned to the house, representing the First District which had virtually the same boundaries it had had when he was first sent to congress more than 30 years before. He was a delegate to the Democratic National Convention in 1852, 1868, 1876 and 1880.

St. Martin was born in St. Charles Parish and died in New Orleans.

The long hiatus between St. Martin's two terms in the U.S. House of Representatives can be partially explained by the intervening Civil War.

References

External links

1820 births
1893 deaths
Democratic Party members of the Louisiana House of Representatives
Democratic Party members of the United States House of Representatives from Louisiana
19th-century American politicians